Rhododendron roxieanum is a species of flowering plant in the family Ericaceae, native to central China and Tibet. Its variety Rhododendron roxieanum var. oreonastes, called the mountain rolled-leaf rhododendron, has gained the Royal Horticultural Society's Award of Garden Merit.

Varieties
The following varieties are currently accepted:
Rhododendron roxieanum var. oreonastes (Balf.f. & Forrest) T.L.Ming

References

roxieanum
Endemic flora of China
Plants described in 1915